The following is a listing of the documentation available for Hickam Air Force Base, now part of Joint Base Pearl Harbor–Hickam on the Hawaiian island of Oahu, through the public-domain Historic American Buildings Survey (HABS). See separate lists for Pearl Harbor Naval Base, the former Barbers Point Naval Air Station, and Schofield Barracks.

HABS surveys

Historic American Buildings Survey in Hawaii